Abubaker Tabula  (born 12 June 1980) is a Ugandan footballer and coach. He is a former player on Uganda National football team The "Uganda Cranes" and also captained the team in 2005.

Career 
The defender played previously for SC Villa 2001, Kampala City Council FC 2005 Proline FC in 2013, Simba FC,  Rwandan club APR FC 2007  and recently in Sweden for GIF Sundsvall.

Tabula currently coaches Maroons FC in Uganda. He is one of the best left back in Uganda. He is also a member of All Start.

He is remembered fog to remove an alleged fetish in a 2004 Afcon qualifier against Rwanda at Namboole.

Notes 

1980 births
Living people
Ugandan footballers
Uganda international footballers
Ugandan expatriate footballers
Allsvenskan players
GIF Sundsvall players
Ugandan expatriate sportspeople in Rwanda
APR F.C. players
Expatriate footballers in Rwanda
Expatriate footballers in Sweden
Kampala Capital City Authority FC players
Bright Stars FC players
Association football defenders